Robert Brett may refer to:

Robert Brett (1851–1929), politician and doctor in Canada
Robert Brett (MP) (c. 1566–1620), MP for Dover
Robert Brett (surgeon) (1808–1874), English surgeon
Bob Brett (1953–2021), Australian tennis coach

See also
Henry Robert Brett (1868–1932), Dean of Belfast